Oleksandr Ivanovych Borodai (1844–1919) was Ukrainian and American engineer, bandurist, Ukrainian political and cultural activist.

Borodai was born in Poltava region (then Russian Empire). His birth surname was Borodayevski. After studying in Cadet Corps he became an officer. Later he graduated from the politechincal Instite he became military engineer electrician. In the 1870s he emigrated to the United States and changed his last name to Borodai. In the 1890s he returned to Ukraine and took part in political and cultural activities.

He took interest in Ukrainian folk music and even begat teacher of kobza music in Lysenko music school, Kiev. In 1902-1903 he was one of the initiators of the idea of the preservation of kobzar music by means of sound recording using recently invented phonograph.

In 1919 he was shot by the Bolsheviks.

References

1844 births
1919 deaths
Bandurists
Ukrainian musicians
American male musicians
American engineers
Executed Ukrainian people